Kija or Gija may refer to:

 Jizi, known in Korean as Kija or Gija, a semi-legendary figure and founder of the Gija Joseon of ancient Korea
 Gija people (or Kija), an ethnic group of Australia
 Kija language, their language
 Queen Kiya of ancient Egypt, also spelled Kija

See also 
 Khija

Language and nationality disambiguation pages